The Queen & Zak Grieve is a six-part documentary television series produced for The Australian newspaper. The series investigates the story of Zak Grieve, a young indigenous man from Australia's Northern Territory who was sentenced to life imprisonment for a murder even the judge said he did not physically commit.

The multiple Walkley Award nominated series was presented by investigative reporter Dan Box and was developed and produced by In Films, in association with The Australian and Screen Australia.

Series
The Queen & Zak Grieve follows journalist Dan Box, national crime reporter at The Australian newspaper, through the town of Katherine in Australia’s Northern Territory as he and his team investigate the killing of Ray Niceforo in 2011 and the events that led to 19-year-old Aboriginal man Zak Grieve being jailed, despite evidence he was not there when the crime took place.

The Northern Territory has had a 20-year non-parole mandatory minimum sentence for murder since 2004. In addition, if an individual fails to stop a murder in the state, that party can also be convicted of murder. The judge who presided over Grieve’s case described the conviction as an “injustice”.

The series features exclusive interviews with many of the people involved, as well as rare crime scene footage, forensic photographs, police interviews with suspects and trial recordings from the case.

Aftermath 
Following the broadcast of the series, the Northern Territory Attorney-General Natasha Fyles agreed to forward a mercy plea application to the Administrator of the Territory. After the Administrator’s secretary told Zak Grieve's mother Glenice, that a letter she had written pleading for her son's release had formally triggered the mercy plea process, the NT’s Chief Minister, Michael Gunner, described Zak’s case as an “anomaly” of “blunt” legislation.

Opposition Leader Gary Higgins, said he would support reforming the Territory’s mandatory sentencing laws for murder. The Attorney-General said the royal prerogative of mercy was retained in the Northern Territory and exercised by the Administrator on the advice of the government, handed down by Cabinet.

Zak Grieve remains in prison.

Key characters
 Zak Grieve - Sentenced to life imprisonment. 
 Darren Halfpenny - Pleaded guilty to helping carry out the murder of Ray Niceforo. Agreed to give evidence for the prosecution.
 Chris Malyschko - Admitted beating Ray Niceforo to death. Pleaded self defence. 
 Bronwyn Malyschko - Former partner of Ray Niceforo and mother to Chris Malyschko. Paid $15,000 to have Ray Niceforo killed after suffering years of abuse. 
 Ray Niceforo - A member of one of the most successful business families in Katherine. 
 Trevor 'Nipper' Tydd - Bronywn's friend, Chris's flatmate and helped in the planning and organisation of the murder of Ray Niceforo.

Episodes
 The Murder 
 The Victim 
 Zak 
 The Trial 
 Mandatory Sentencing 
 The Missing Man

Music
The music for the series was composed by Helena Czajka.

Online
The series was streamed on The Australian newspaper's website from August 28, 2017. Each episode was supported on a custom built online hub,  with additional material, including extensive editorial, extended interviews, maps, forensic photographs and interactive elements.

Broadcast
The series premiered on Crime + Investigation on September 27, 2017  and on NITV March 4, 2018.

Awards and nominations

See also 
 Mandatory Sentencing 
 Northern Territory

References

External links
The Queen & Zak Grieve at The Australian
The Queen & Zak Grieve at In Films

2010s Australian documentary television series
2017 Australian television series debuts
2017 Australian television series endings
2010s crime television series